Ficus racemosa, the cluster fig, red river fig or gular, is a species of plant in the family Moraceae. It is native to Australia and tropical Asia. It is a fast-growing plant with large, very rough leaves, usually attaining the size of a large shrub, although older specimens can grow quite large and gnarled. It is unusual in that its figs grow on or close to the tree trunk, termed cauliflory. 

The fruits are commonly eaten as a vegetable after the seeds have been discarded, and made into stir-fries and curries. The fruits are a favourite staple of the common Indian macaque. It serves as a food plant for the caterpillars of the two-brand crow butterfly (Euploea sylvester) of northern Australia.

In Hinduism

According to the Shatapatha Brahmana, the Audumbara tree was created from the force of Indra, the leader of the gods that came out of his flesh when he overindulged in soma:

From his hair his thought flowed, and became millet; from his skin his honour flowed, and became the aśvattha tree (ficus religiosa); from his flesh his force flowed, and became the udumbara tree (ficus glomerata); from his bones his sweet drink flowed, and became the nyagrodha tree (ficus indica); from his marrow his drink, the Soma juice, flowed, and became rice: in this way his energies, or vital powers, went from him. 

In the Atharva Veda, this fig tree (Sanskrit: Umbara or Audumbara) is given prominence as a means for acquiring prosperity and vanquishing foes.  For instance, regarding an amulet of the Audumbara tree, a hymn (AV xix, 31) extols:
The Lord of amulets art thou, most mighty: in the wealth's
ruler that engendered riches,
These gains are lodged in the, and all great treasures. Amulet,
conquer thou: far from us banish malignity and indigence,
and hunger.
Vigour art thou, in me do thou plant vigour: riches art thou, so
do thou grant me riches.
Plenty art thou, so prosper me with plenty: House-holder, hear
a householder's petition.

It has been described in the story of Raja Harischandra of the Ikshvaku dynasty, that the crown was a branch of this Audumbara tree, set in a circlet of gold. Additionally, the throne (simhasana) was constructed out of this wood and the royal personage would ascend it on his knee, chanting to the gods to ascend it with him, which they did so, albeit unseen.

The tree has been worshipped as Abode under which Lord Dattatreya teaches that to teach first learn from others however small or big. There is always something to be learnt from One and to learn new things one has to learn to unlearn as per the time. The tree is seen planted in all the places associated with Lord Dattatreya who is seen as an icon Rishi a sage who represents all the three of the trinity of Hinduism: Brahma, Vishnu and Shiva (Creator, Preserver and destroyer) needed for each one to learn by unlearning the obsolete. this is the plan of evolution in analogy. Its leaves are an indispensable part of many Hindu havans.

In Buddhism

Both the tree and the flower are referred to as the Audumbara (Sanskrit, Pali; Devanagari: औदुंबर) in Buddhism.  Udumbara can also refer to the blue lotus (nila-udumbara, "blue udumbara") flower.  The udumbara flower appears in chapters 2 and 27 of the Lotus Sutra, an important Mahayana Buddhist text.  The Japanese word udon-ge (literally "udon/udumbara flower") was used by Dōgen Zenji to refer to the flower of the udumbara tree in chapter 68 of the Shōbōgenzō ("Treasury of the Eye of the True Dharma").  Dōgen places the udonge in the context of the Flower Sermon given by Gautama Buddha on Vulture Peak. Udonge is also used to refer to the eggs of the lacewing insect.  The eggs are laid in a pattern similar to a flower, and its shape is used for divination in Asian fortune telling.

In Theravada Buddhism, the plant is said to have used as the tree for achieved enlightenment (bodhi) by the 26th Lord Buddha, Konaagama.

Uses

The Ovambo people call the fruit of the cluster fig eenghwiyu and use it to distill ombike, their traditional liquor.

Other uses
The bark of Ficus racemosa is used as a home remedy. In India, the bark is rubbed on a stone with water to make a paste, which can be applied to boils or mosquito bites. Allow the paste to dry on the skin and reapply after a few hours. The rough leaves of the plant can also be used to remove caterpillar bristles lodged in skin. A common folk remedy is to rub the affected area lightly with a leaf, which effectively dislodges the stinging hairs.

References

External links

racemosa
Flora of Australia
Flora of tropical Asia
Trees in Buddhism
Plants described in 1753
Taxa named by Carl Linnaeus